Kachin Theological College (KTC) is a member of the Association for Theological Education in South East Asia (ATESEA). It is located in Nawng Nang, Myitkyina, Kachin State in the north of Myanmar. It is an evangelical school under Kachin Baptist Convention (KBC).

History
Kachin Theological College was founded in 1932 by missionaries in Bhamo, Kachin State.  In 1935, the Bible School transferred to Kutkai, Northern Shan State, Course extended to 2 years. In, 1966 Bible School moved to the present campus situated in Nawng Nang, Myitkyina, Kachin State. The Diamond Jubilee (75th anniversary) celebration along with the 58th commencement service of the college will be held on March 24–30, 2008.

References

External links

Seminaries and theological colleges in Myanmar